Indecent Proposal is a 1993 American erotic drama film directed by Adrian Lyne and written by Amy Holden Jones. It is based on the 1988 novel by Jack Engelhard, in which a couple's marriage is disrupted by a stranger's offer of a million dollars for the wife to spend the night with him. It stars Robert Redford, Demi Moore, and Woody Harrelson. It received mostly negative reviews, but was a box-office success, grossing nearly $267 million worldwide on a $38 million budget.

Plot
David and Diana Murphy are married high school sweethearts living in California. Diana works as a real estate agent, while David hopes to establish himself as an architect by designing their dream home. The couple invest everything they have in David's project, purchasing beachfront property in Santa Monica and beginning construction, but the recession leaves Diana without houses to sell and David without a job. In desperate need of $50,000 to save their land from being repossessed, they travel to Las Vegas, determined to win the money.

At a casino, Diana catches the eye of billionaire John Gage, while David wins over $25,000 at craps. Reveling in their winnings, Diana assures David that she loves him regardless of the money. The next day, they lose everything at roulette; leaving the casino, they notice a crowd gathered to watch Gage play poker. Gage asks Diana to join him for good luck, and she makes a winning craps roll on his $1 million bet. As thanks, Gage insists on paying for the Murphys' stay, giving them a lavish hotel suite and a dress he saw Diana admire. After an enjoyable evening together, Gage offers the couple $1 million to allow him to spend a night with Diana, but she and David refuse.

After a sleepless night, the Murphys agree to Gage's proposal, and David contacts his lawyer, who prepares a contract for the arrangement. Leaving Diana with Gage, David has a change of heart and races to stop them, but arrives just as they depart by helicopter. Gage flies Diana to his private yacht, and offers her a chance to void their deal and return to her husband if he loses a toss of his lucky coin. He wins the toss, and Diana spends the night with him.

Agreeing to forget the incident, the Murphys return home, and learn their property was foreclosed and resold. Overcome with jealousy, David accuses Diana of continuing to see Gage after finding his business card in her wallet, which she denies knowing about. Discovering that it was Gage who bought out their land, Diana angrily confronts him, and rejects his attempts to pursue her. When she informs David, their tension reaches a breaking point and they separate; Diana later tells him to keep all the money.

Weeks later, Gage visits Diana at work and renews his advances. Initially resistant, she eventually consents to spending time with him, and a romance develops between them. Haunted by happy memories of his wife, David hits rock bottom, leading to a public confrontation with Gage and Diana. He pulls his life back together and finds a teaching position, and Diana files for divorce. Finding her at a zoo benefit with Gage, David donates the entire $1 million in a charity auction bid, then makes his peace with Diana and signs their divorce papers.

Realizing that Diana will never love him the way she loves David, Gage lies to her that she is merely the latest member of his "million-dollar club" of women. Seeing through his deception, she gratefully ends their relationship; before parting ways, he gives her his lucky coin, which she realizes is double-headed. Diana returns to the pier where David proposed to her seven years earlier, finding him there. Repeating their unique declaration of love, they join hands.

Cast

 Robert Redford as John Gage
 Demi Moore as Diana Murphy
 Woody Harrelson as David Murphy
 Seymour Cassel as Mr. Shackleford, Gage's chauffeur
 Oliver Platt as Jeremy Green
 Billy Bob Thornton as Day Tripper
 Rip Taylor as Mr. Langford
 Billy Connolly as auction MC
 Pamela Holt as David's girlfriend
 Tommy Bush as Mr. Murphy
 Sheena Easton as herself
 Herbie Hancock as himself

Release

Box office
Indecent Proposal was a box office success, grossing $106,614,059 in the US and Canada and $160,000,000 internationally for a worldwide total of over $266,000,000.

It opened on 1,694 screens in the United States and Canada on April 7, 1993 and grossed $18,387,632 in its opening weekend to top the US box office, the biggest opening at the time for an April release. It was number one for four weeks.

It entered international release on April 23, 1993 when it previewed on 66 screens in Australia for the weekend. Despite only playing for three days, it topped the Australian box office for the week with a three-day gross of $0.8 million (A$1.16 million).  It officially opened in Australia on April 29 and remained at number one for four more weeks. In the UK, it also benefited from previews in topping the UK box office with an opening weekend gross of $2.4 million (£1.5 million) including previews. It remained number one in the UK for three weeks. In Italy it was Paramount/United International Pictures' second biggest ever opening with an opening weekend gross of $1.6 million.

Critical reception
It received generally negative reviews from critics. Gene Siskel gave it thumbs down, but Roger Ebert gave it thumbs up, on Siskel & Ebert; Ebert also wrote a positive print review. Susan Faludi, a feminist writer, objected to the movie's positioning of the female character.  Another feminist characterized it as a women in prison film.

Indecent Proposal has a 34% "rotten" rating at Rotten Tomatoes based on 47 reviews, with an average rating of 4.8/10. The consensus reads: "Lurid but acted with gusto, Indecent Proposal has difficulty keeping it up beyond its initial titillating premise." Audience response was less negative, with those polled by CinemaScore giving an average grade of "B" on an A+ to F scale. The film is listed in Golden Raspberry Award founder John Wilson's book The Official Razzie Movie Guide as one of the "100 most enjoyably worst movies ever made".

Awards and nominations

Differences between novel and film
Engelhard's novel contained cultural friction that the screenwriter left out of the movie: the main character, named Joshua, is Jewish, and his billionaire foil is Arab. In a review of the novel, The New York Times summarized its themes as "the sanctity of marriage versus the love of money, the Jew versus significant non-Jews such as shiksas and sheiks, skill versus luck, materialism versus spirituality, Israel versus the Arab countries, the past versus the future, and the religious world versus the secular one."

Soundtrack
The soundtrack was released on April 6, 1993, by MCA Records. "In All the Right Places" by Lisa Stansfield was released as the album's lead single on May 24, 1993, and is the film's theme song. Sheena Easton makes a cameo appearance in the movie performing "The Nearness of You" at a pivotal part of the movie. The length of the soundtrack is 60 minutes and 37 seconds. "No Ordinary Love" by English band Sade was also prominently featured in the film, though it was not included on its soundtrack album.

In 2015 Intrada Records released an album of John Barry's score.

Remake 
On July 30, 2018, Paramount Players announced that a remake of the film was in development, with the screenplay being written by Erin Cressida Wilson.

In popular culture 
The animation series The Simpsons'''s 2002 episode "Half-Decent Proposal" parodies the movie's premise.

In the television series Mad About You'', "A Pair of Hearts", during the end credits, the married couple Paul and Jamie Buchman are approached by a man who offers a million dollars to sleep with Jamie.  They immediately reply "Sure!", and, after a quick smooch, Jamie leaves with the man (to the laughter of the audience).

See also
 Lecherous millionaire
 List of films set in Las Vegas

References

External links
 
 
 
 
 

 

1993 films
1993 romantic drama films
1990s English-language films
Adultery in films
American romantic drama films
Films about adultery in the United States
Films about businesspeople
Films directed by Adrian Lyne
Films scored by John Barry (composer)
Films set in Los Angeles
Films set in the Las Vegas Valley
Films shot in Los Angeles
Films shot in the Las Vegas Valley
Films with screenplays by Amy Holden Jones
Films about gambling
Golden Raspberry Award winning films
Paramount Pictures films
Films about roulette
1990s American films